Sebastian Balfour (born in 1941) is an English historian and Professor Emeritus of Contemporary Spanish Studies at the London School of Economics.

Works

Author 
Books
 
 
 

Chapters in collective works
 

 

Articles in academic journals

Co-author

Editor

Notes

References

Links 
 Professor Sebastian Balfour - Sebastian Balfour official website
 Professor Sebastian Balfour - London School of Economics

Living people
English historians
Historians of Spain
Academics of the London School of Economics
1941 births